Henry Balcom (c. 1804 – July 14, 1882) was a shipbuilder and political figure in Nova Scotia. He represented Halifax County in the Nova Scotia House of Assembly from 1863 to 1871 first as a Reformer and then as a member of the Anti-Confederation Party.

He was the son of Jonas Balcom and Mary Chase. He was married twice: first to Honore Farrell and then to a Mary Quillan. Balcom served as a justice of the peace for Halifax County from 1863 to 1873. He first lived in Salmon River, but later moved to Halifax. He died at Salmon River in Halifax County.

References 
 A Directory of the Members of the Legislative Assembly of Nova Scotia, 1758-1958, Public Archives of Nova Scotia (1958)

1804 births
1882 deaths
Nova Scotia Liberal Party MLAs